Resul Kastrati (born 20 March 1994) is an Albanian professional footballer who most recently played for FK Kukësi in the Albanian Superliga.

References

1994 births
Living people
People from Has (municipality)
Association football central defenders
Albanian footballers
KF Teuta Durrës players
FK Kukësi players
Kategoria Superiore players